Siritunga Jayasuriya was a contestant in the Sri Lanka presidential election in 2005. He received 35,405 votes, 0.36% of the votes cast and came third. He is a trade unionist and leader of the United Socialist Party. He was formerly a member of the Lanka Sama Samaja Party and later the Nava Sama Samaja Party.

In early 2007, Siritunga narrowly escaped a raid by 300 armed thugs at a place where a rally against Sri Lankan Civil War was due to take place.

References

External links

Candidates in the 2005 Sri Lankan presidential election
Candidates in the 2010 Sri Lankan presidential election
Candidates in the 2015 Sri Lankan presidential election
Candidates in the 2019 Sri Lankan presidential election
Committee for a Workers' International
Lanka Sama Samaja Party politicians
Living people
Sri Lankan trade unionists
Sri Lankan Trotskyists
Year of birth missing (living people)